Shintaro Kai (born 29 May 1981) is a Japanese professional golfer.

Kai has won one tournament on the Japan Golf Tour and has featured in the top 100 of the Official World Golf Ranking. He has also won a tournament on the Japan Challenge Tour.

Professional wins (2)

Japan Golf Tour wins (1)

Japan Challenge Tour wins (1)

Results in major championships

Note: Kai never played in the Masters Tournament or the PGA Championship.

CUT = missed the half-way cut

References

External links

Japanese male golfers
Japan Golf Tour golfers
Sportspeople from Miyazaki Prefecture
1981 births
Living people